Euxoa anarmodia is a moth of the family Noctuidae. It is found from Algeria to Egypt, Jordan, Israel and Lebanon.

Adults are on wing from October to December. There is one generation per year.

Larvae have been reared on Hyosyamus muticus, but the food plants in nature are unknown.

External links
 Noctuinae of Israel

Euxoa
Moths of the Middle East
Moths described in 1897